Southern Cross (French: La croix du sud) is a 1932 French drama film directed by André Hugon and starring Charles de Rochefort, Suzanne Christy and Alexandre Mihalesco.

The film's sets were designed by the art director Christian-Jaque. The storyline includes "miscegnation" and an African chief who chooses an African woman over a white woman. It was filmed in Africa and Joinville.

Cast
 Charles de Rochefort as Aftan  
 Kaissa Robba as Dassine  
 Alexandre Mihalesco as Arbi  
 Suzanne Christy as Madeleine Ménard  
 Jean Toulout as Le professeur Ménard 
 Jean Heuzé as Lieutenant Darsène  
 Tahar Hanache as Le chef nomade  
 Christian-Jaque as Un lieutenant

References

Bibliography 
 Rège, Philippe. Encyclopedia of French Film Directors, Volume 1. Scarecrow Press, 2009.

External links 
 

French drama films
1932 films
1930s French-language films
Films directed by André Hugon
French black-and-white films
1932 drama films
1930s French films